The first European Men's Artistic Gymnastics Championships took place in 1955. In this championship, there was no team competition, only individual competitions. Only men took part, and the championship took place in Frankfurt am Main.

The Soviet Union dominated the championships, and took the top two places, with a total of five golds in the apparatus finals. Boris Shakhlin, who won a total of 14 World Championship medals and 13 Olympic medals in gymnastics, won the overall competition.

Results

Individual combined 
Note: Free (FX), Pommel horse (PH), Rings (R), Vault (VT), Parallel bars (PB), High bar (HB), .

Apparatus finals

Free

Pommel horse

Rings

Vault

Parallel bars

High bars

Medal table

References 
 
 

European Artistic Gymnastics Championships
European Mens Artistic Gymnastics Championships, 1955
1955 in European sport
1955 in German sport
International gymnastics competitions hosted by West Germany